The Palestinian territories are the two regions of the former British Mandate for Palestine that have been militarily occupied by Israel since the Six-Day War of 1967, namely: the West Bank (including East Jerusalem) and the Gaza Strip. The International Court of Justice (ICJ) has referred to the West Bank, including East Jerusalem, as "the Occupied Palestinian Territory", and this term was used as the legal definition by the ICJ in its advisory opinion of July 2004. The term occupied Palestinian territory was used by the United Nations and other international organizations between October 1999 and December 2012 to refer to areas controlled by the Palestinian National Authority, but from 2012, when Palestine was admitted as one of its non-member observer states, the United Nations started using exclusively the name State of Palestine. The European Union (EU) also adopts the term occupied Palestinian territory, with a parallel term Palestinian Authority territories also occasionally used.

The Gaza Strip and the West Bank had been occupied by Egypt and Jordan, respectively, since the 1948 Arab–Israeli War until the Six-Day War of 1967. Israel occupied the West Bank and the Gaza Strip in 1967 and has since maintained control. In 1980, Israel officially absorbed East Jerusalem and proclaimed the whole of the city to be its capital. The inclusion, though never formally amounting to legal annexation, was condemned internationally and declared "null and void" by the United Nations Security Council. The Palestinian National Authority, the United Nations, the international legal and humanitarian bodies and the international community regard East Jerusalem as part of the West Bank, and consequently a part of the Palestinian territories. The Palestinian National Authority never exercised sovereignty over the area, although it housed its offices in Orient House and several other buildings as an assertion of its sovereign interests. Israeli sovereignty over East Jerusalem has not been recognized by the International community, on the grounds that the unilateral annexation of territory occupied during war contravenes the Fourth Geneva Convention. The cost of the occupation for Israel over four decades (1967–2007) is estimated to amount to $50 billion. The World Bank estimates the annual cost in 2013 to the Palestinian economy of Israeli occupation at $3.4 billion.

In 1988, with the Palestine Liberation Organization (PLO) intention to declare a Palestinian State, Jordan renounced all territorial claims to the West Bank, including East Jerusalem. In 1993, following the Oslo Accords, parts of the territories politically came under the jurisdiction of the Palestinian National Authority (Palestinian enclaves, technically known as Areas A and B). Israel still exercised full military control and, civil control over 61% of the West Bank (Area C). The Oslo Accords established access to the sea for Gaza within 20 nautical miles from the shore. In October 2006 Israel imposed a 6-mile limit, and at the conclusion of the 2008-2009 Gaza War restricted access to a 3-nautical-mile limit, beyond which a no-go zone exists. As a result, in 2012 more than 3,000 Palestinian fishermen were denied access to 85% of the maritime areas agreed to in 1995. The majority of the Dead Sea area is off-limits to Palestinian use, and Palestinians are denied access to its coastline.

Israel disengaged from the Gaza Strip in 2005. The Hamas takeover of Gaza in 2007 divided the Palestinian territories politically. Abbas's Fatah largely ruled the West Bank and was recognized internationally as the official Palestinian Authority. In 2009, the UN considered the West Bank and the Gaza Strip to be still occupied by Israel.

On 29 November 2012, UNGA 67/19 reaffirmed "the right of the Palestinian people to self-determination and to independence in their State of Palestine on the Palestinian territory occupied since 1967" and decided "to accord to Palestine non-member observer State status in the United Nations". The next month, a UN legal memorandum recognized Palestine's preference of the name "State of Palestine" with Mahmoud Abbas as its current leader. It was noted that there was no legal impediment to using the designation 'Palestine' to refer to the geographical area of the Palestinian territory. It was also explained that there was also no bar to the continued use of the term "Occupied Palestinian Territory including East Jerusalem" or such other terminology as might customarily be used by the UN General Assembly. The ISO adopted the name change in 2013. The UN Security Council continues to treat Palestine as a non-sovereign entity, preventing its admission to the UN General Assembly as a full member state. Israeli governments have maintained that the area involved is within territorial dispute. The extent of the territories, while subject to future negotiations, have frequently been revendicated by the Palestinian Authority as the Green Line. Since the Palestinian Declaration of Independence in 1988, 135 UN Member Nations have recognized the State of Palestine. It has not been recognized by Israel and most Western nations, including the United States.

In 2014, Fatah and Hamas agreed to hold elections and form a compromise Unity Government. The government survived the 2014 Israel–Gaza conflict, but dissolved on 17 June 2015 after President Abbas said it was unable to operate in the Gaza Strip.

Name

The United Nations, the European Union, International Committee of the Red Cross, and the government of the United Kingdom, have used for many years the terms the "Occupied Palestinian Territory" or "Occupied Palestinian Territories".

The Israeli Ministry of Foreign Affairs and Dore Gold have objected to the use of the term "Occupied Palestinian Territories". The phrase "occupied Palestine" has been used by Palestinians to mean Israel although Professor Julie Peteet also says that this usage diminished with the advent of the peace process and PLO recognition of Israel. A parallel exists in the aspirations of David Ben-Gurion, Menachem Begin, to establish Jewish sovereignty over all of Greater Israel in trust for the Jewish people.

Boundaries

The Palestinian territories consist of two distinct areas: the West Bank (including East Jerusalem) and the Gaza Strip. Although the boundaries are commonly referred to as the "1967 borders", they are historically the armistice lines under the 1949 Armistice Agreements, which brought an end to the 1948 Arab–Israeli War, and are commonly referred to as the Green Line. The 1949 armistice lines were expressly declared to be armistice lines, and not international borders. Some Palestinian negotiators have claimed a return to those lines as the borders of a future Palestinian state, while Hamas does not recognize the State of Israel at all. The Arab League has supported these boundaries as the borders of the future State of Palestine in the 2002 Arab Peace Initiative.

The eastern limit of the West Bank is the border with Jordan. The Israel–Jordan peace treaty defined that border as the international border, and Jordan renounced all claims to territory west of it. The border segment between Jordan and the West Bank was left undefined pending a definitive agreement on the status of the territory.

The southern limit of the Gaza Strip is the border with Egypt. Egypt renounced all claims to land north of the international border, including the Gaza Strip, in the Egypt–Israel peace treaty. The Palestinians were not parties to either agreement.

The Gaza Strip is bounded by the Mediterranean Sea. The natural geographic boundary of the West Bank, as the name implies, is the Jordan River. To the Territories belong the territorial waters of the Gaza Strip and the part of the Dead Sea between the West Bank and the Jordan border-line (see adjacent CIA map), which are also completely controlled by Israel.

Palestinian state

The Palestinian territories are part of the area intended by the United Nations to become the territory of the future State of Palestine. Originally, a larger area was allotted to the planned Palestinian state in Resolution 181 of 29 November 1947, but the Arabs rejected it and in the 1948 Palestine war, the Israeli army conquered major parts of it. While in the Partition Plan about 45% of historic Palestine was destined for the Arabic state, the Palestinian territories constitute only some 23%. The last figure is including all space occupied by Israeli settlements, walls, and roads.

In the UN, nearly all countries voted in favour of Resolution 58/292 of 17 May 2004; namely, that the boundaries of a future Palestinian state should be based on the pre-1967 borders, which correspond with the Green Line. The Resolution affirmed, in connection with the Palestinian right to self-determination and to sovereignty, that the independent State of Palestine should be based on the pre-1967 borders. In Resolution 43/177 of 15 December 1988, the declaration of independence of the State of Palestine was acknowledged by the UN General Assembly, but it was not admitted as a member state. In the same resolution, their sovereignty over the Occupied Palestinian Territory was recognized.

On 29 November 2012, the UN General Assembly passed United Nations General Assembly resolution 67/19 changing Palestine's observer status at the UN from "entity" to "non-member state" by a vote of 138 to 9, with 41 abstentions.

East Jerusalem

Immediately after the Six-Day War of June 1967, Israel effectively annexed East Jerusalem, an area comprising the much smaller prior Jordanian municipality of east Jerusalem and a surrounding area of the West Bank, as far as Kalandia to the north and Har Homa to the south. Israeli law, jurisdiction and administration were applied to this area, which was also made part of the Israeli Jerusalem municipality in its entirety. East Jerusalem residents became Israeli residents with blue Israeli ID cards. In 1980, the Knesset elevated the issue of the unity of Jerusalem to constitutional status by enacting Basic Law: Jerusalem the Capital of Israel, an act which was condemned by much of the world community, the few, mainly Latin American, embassies maintained in west Jerusalem promptly moving to Tel Aviv. Israel's annexation of East Jerusalem lacks international recognition by any country. Seven UNSC resolutions, including United Nations Security Council Resolution 478 declared it "null and void" and required that it be rescinded, stating that it was a violation of international law (the Fourth Geneva Convention). The United Nations never explicitly recognized Jerusalem as part of either Israel or Palestine, as Resolution 181 (1947) was never revoked. In Resolution 181, Jerusalem was intended to become a corpus separatum under international regime. Most countries do not recognize either West Jerusalem or Jerusalem as Israel's capital.

Palestinians regard East Jerusalem as the capital of the future Palestinian state. East Jerusalem is generally recognized as part of the Palestinian Territories. In UN resolutions concerning Israel, East Jerusalem is routinely referred to as a part of the Occupied Palestinian Territory.

According to the Israeli Supreme Court, the Fourth Geneva Convention, which prohibits unilateral annexation of occupied territory, does not apply to East Jerusalem, as there was no "legitimate sovereign" recognised by Israel and its allies previously exercising control over the territory. In Israel, there has always been large support for retaining all of Jerusalem under Israeli sovereignty, although opinions differ regarding the large number of outlying Palestinian villages and neighbourhoods annexed to Jerusalem beyond "core" East Jerusalem (the Old City, Sheikh Jarrah and the large post-1967 Jewish neighborhoods such as Ramot, Ramat Eshkol, French Hill and Gilo). A few times, there were Israeli or U.S. proposals to divide East Jerusalem between Israel and the Palestinians. In the 1995 Beilin–Abu Mazen agreement, Israeli negotiators proposed Palestinian sovereignty over some Arab neighborhoods within an expanded Jerusalem that would include annexed Israeli neighborhoods and major settlement blocs. In 2000, U.S. president Bill Clinton offered a similar proposal in his Clinton Parameters. In more recent years, the Israeli position has strongly been favourable to keeping all of Jerusalem under Israeli sovereignty.

Gaza Strip

In 2005, Israel pulled all its remaining forces out of the Gaza Strip and dismantled its settlements. Nevertheless, according to the international community, the Gaza Strip is still considered to be occupied by Israel. Israel has denied that it occupies the Gaza Strip, but two of the three border sectors of the Gaza Strip, together with the coast and airspace, are controlled by Israel (the third border sector near Rafah is controlled by Egypt). The UN Special Rapporteur on the situation of human rights in the Palestinian territories occupied since 1967 stated in 2007:
Israel remains an occupying Power in respect of Gaza. Arguments that Israel ceased its occupation of Gaza in 2005 following the evacuation of its settlements and the withdrawal of its troops take no account of the fact that Israel retains effective control over Gaza by means of its control over Gaza's external borders, airspace, territorial waters, population registry, tax revenues and governmental functions. The effectiveness of this control is emphasized by regular military incursions and rocket attacks.

Governance

The political status of the territories has been the subject of negotiations between Israel and the PLO and of numerous statements and resolutions by the United Nations. (See List of United Nations resolutions concerning Israel.) Since 1994, the autonomous Palestinian National Authority has exercised various degrees of control in large parts of the territories, as a result of the Declaration of Principles contained in the Oslo Accords. The United States government considers the West Bank and Gaza as a single entity for political, economic, legal and other purposes. The State Department and other U.S. government agencies, such as USAID West Bank and Gaza, have been tasked with projects in the areas of democracy, governance, resources, and infrastructure. Part of the USAID mission is to provide flexible and discrete support for implementation of the Quartet Road Map. The Road Map is an internationally backed plan that calls for the progressive development of a viable Palestinian State in the West Bank and Gaza. Participating states provide assistance through direct contributions or through the Palestinian State account established by the World Bank.

Hamas won a majority of seats in elections for the Palestinian Parliament in 2006 and formed a government in Ramallah for the entire PA largely shunned by the United States and Israel. However, the Fatah movement continued to dominate the PA security forces in both the West Bank and Gaza Strip. In 2007, Hamas took control of the Gaza Strip by force, executing PA officers and removing its officials, many of whom, such as Muhammad Dahlan, escaped the Gaza Strip with their families. Mahmoud Abbas promptly deposed the Hamas-dominated PA government, and two rival administrations were created, a Fatah-controlled one in the West Bank, with which Israel, the US and the EU resumed business, and a Hamas-controlled one in the Gaza Strip which was largely shunned by the world community. After Hamas intensified rocket and mortar fire on Israeli civilian centers from the Gaza Strip, the United States and Israel instituted a military and economic blockade of the Gaza Strip. When that failed to topple the new government, a covert operation was launched to eliminate Hamas by force. The covert initiative was exposed when confidential State Department documents were accidentally leaked by the U.S. envoy. The talking points delivered to the Fatah leadership said:
Hamas should be given a clear choice, with a clear deadline: they either accept a new government that meets the Quartet principles, or they reject it. The consequences of Hamas' decision should also be clear: If Hamas does not agree within the prescribed time, you should make clear your intention to declare a state of emergency and form an emergency government explicitly committed to that platform.

Since the Battle of Gaza (2007), the administration of the territories has been contested by two rival factions of the Palestinian National Authority, with Hamas controlling the Gaza Strip and Fatah continuing to administer the West Bank. Both groups claim legitimacy over leadership of the Palestinian territories. Most countries with an interest in the issues, including most of the Arab countries, recognize the administration of Mahmoud Abbas as the legitimate government over both Palestinian Territories.

During Operation Cast Lead the UN Security Council adopted Resolution 1860 (2009), which said that the Gaza Strip constitutes an integral part of the territory occupied in 1967 that will be a part of the Palestinian state.

On 15 December 2011, Iceland recognized Palestine as an independent and sovereign state within the pre-1967 Six-Day War borders; Össur Skarphéðinsson, Minister for Foreign Affairs of Iceland, and Dr. Riad Malki, the Foreign Minister of Palestine, formally confirmed the establishment of full diplomatic relations between Iceland and Palestine.

The 2014 Fatah–Hamas Gaza Agreement provided for elections and the formation of a compromise unity government. The 2014 Israel–Gaza conflict intervened, however the unity government survived. In August, Palestinian leaders said they would apply to the United Nations Security Council for the establishment of a timetable for ending the Israeli occupation in the West Bank. The application would be made on 15 September 2014, following an Arab League meeting on 5 September at which support for the move would be requested. Unless a timetable was established, the Palestinian leadership said it would apply to the International Criminal Court where it would hold Israel responsible for its actions not only in the West Bank, but in the Gaza Strip.

Political status and sovereignty

The international community regards the Palestinian territories, meaning the West Bank including East Jerusalem and the Gaza Strip, as territories occupied by Israel. Israel has withdrawn its military forces from the Gaza strip, but it continues to be designated the occupying power in the Gaza Strip by the United Nations, the United States and various human rights organizations. The final status of the Palestinian Territories as an independent state is supported by the countries that form the Quartet's "Road map for peace". The government of Israel has also accepted the road map but with 14 reservations.

A transfer of powers and responsibilities for the Gaza Strip and Jericho took place pursuant to the Israel–PLO 4 May 1994 Cairo Agreement on the Gaza Strip and the Jericho Area. In other areas of the West Bank, transfer of powers took place pursuant to the Israel–PLO 28 September 1995 Interim Agreement, the Israel–PLO 15 January 1997 Protocol Concerning the Redeployment in Hebron, the Israel–PLO 23 October 1998 Wye River Memorandum, and the 4 September 1999 Sharm el-Sheikh Agreement.

The DOP provides that Israel will retain responsibility during the transitional period for external security and for internal security and public order of Israeli settlements and citizens. Direct negotiations to determine the permanent status of Gaza and the West Bank had begun in September 1999 after a three-year hiatus, but have been derailed by the al-Aqsa Intifada that began in September 2000.

In 2003, the Israeli government issued a plan for total withdrawal from the Gaza Strip and part of the northern West Bank by late 2005. This became known as the Disengagement Plan. The Palestinian Authority welcomed this plan, but declared that until final status, it would still consider the Gaza Strip under Israeli occupation. Many Israelis opposed the plan, and tensions were very high in Israel before and after the Disengagement Plan was approved by the Israeli Knesset on 16 February 2005.

In August 2005, the Israel Defense Forces and Israeli police forcibly removed all settlers from the Gaza Strip. Israel completed the disengagement on 12 September 2005. Presently, most of the West Bank is administered by Israel though 42% of it is under varying degrees of autonomous rule by the Fatah-run Palestinian Authority. The Gaza Strip is currently under the control of Hamas.

The International Criminal Court (ICC) is an independent international treaty organisation with its own legislative assembly. Many of the member states recognise the State of Palestine. The Palestinian Foreign Minister Riad al-Malki presented the ICC prosecutor with documentary evidence which shows that 67 states in Latin America, Asia, Africa, and Europe have legally recognised the State of Palestine.

In January 2010, King Abdullah of Jordan, after a meeting with the Israeli president Shimon Peres at the World Economic Forum in Davos, declared that his country does not want to rule the West Bank and that "the two-state solution" to the Israeli–Palestinian conflict was the only viable option. If rule over the territory was to be transferred to the kingdom, it would only "replace Israeli military rule with Jordanian military rule... and the Palestinians want their own state".

On Thursday, 29 November 2012, In a 138–9 vote (with 41 abstaining) General Assembly resolution 67/19 passed, upgrading Palestine to "non-member observer state" status in the United Nations. The new status equates Palestine's with that of the Holy See. The change in status was described by The Independent as "de facto recognition of the sovereign state of Palestine". The vote was a historic benchmark for the partially recognised State of Palestine and its citizens, whilst it was a diplomatic setback for Israel and the United States. Status as an observer state in the UN will allow the State of Palestine to join treaties and specialised UN agencies, including the International Civil Aviation Organisation, the International Criminal Court, and other organisations for recognised sovereign nations. It shall permit Palestine to claim legal rights over its territorial waters and air space as a sovereign state recognised by the UN, and allow the Palestinian people the right to sue for control of their claimed territory in the International Court of Justice and to bring war-crimes charges against Israel in the International Criminal Court.

Customary international law, including the International Court of Justice's interpretation of the Fourth Geneva Convention in their July 2004 ruling, has been widely interpreted as prohibiting Israel from building settlements, due to its clauses prohibiting the transfer of a civilian population into an occupied territory. This was reaffirmed 5 December 2001, at the Conference of High Contracting Parties to the Fourth Geneva Convention. The participating High Contracting Parties called upon Israel "to fully and effectively respect the Fourth Geneva Convention in the Occupied Palestinian Territory, including East Jerusalem, and to refrain from perpetrating any violation of the Convention. They reaffirm the illegality of the settlements in the said territories and of the extension thereof." Article 47 of the Fourth Geneva Convention prohibits any change of status in occupied territory concluded through negotiations between the occupying power and local authorities under occupation. This finding also suggests that Israel may be in violation of the Rome Statute (one of the primary legal instruments of the International Criminal Court), Article 8, section (2)(b)(viii): "The transfer, directly or indirectly, by the Occupying Power of parts of its own civilian population into the territory it occupies, or the deportation or transfer of all or parts of the population of the occupied territory within or outside this territory" see:. Given that United Nations General Assembly resolution 67/19 upgraded Palestine to non-member observer state status in November 2012, representatives of Palestine may now be able to take members of the Israeli government to the International Criminal Court under violations of the Rome Statute. On 31 January 2012, the United Nations independent "International Fact-Finding Mission on Israeli Settlements in the Occupied Palestinian Territory" filed a report stating that if Israel did not stop all settlement activity immediately and begin withdrawing all settlers from the West Bank, it potentially might face a case at the International Criminal Court, increasing credibility of any Palestinianin attempt to do so.

The UN has, after granting Palestine observer state status, permitted Palestine to title its representative office to the UN as 'The Permanent Observer Mission of the State of Palestine to the United Nations', seen by many as a reflexion of the UN's de facto recognition of the State of Palestine's sovereignty, and Palestine has started to re-title its name accordingly on postal stamps, official documents and passports. The Palestinian authorities have also instructed its diplomats to officially represent 'The State of Palestine', as opposed to the 'Palestine National Authority'. Additionally, on 17 December 2012, UN Chief of Protocol Yeocheol Yoon decided that 'the designation of "State of Palestine" shall be used by the Secretariat in all official United Nations documents'.

Critics point out that implementation of the Oslo Accords has not improved conditions for the population under occupation. Israel contends that the settlements are not illegal as the West Bank is considered a "disputed territory" under international law. United Nations Security Council Resolution 242 recognized Israel's rights to "safe and secure borders", which has been interpreted by the Israeli government as meaning that Israel had a right to West Bank territory for secure borders. The San Remo Conference, binding under international law, further envisioned the West Bank as being part of a sovereign Jewish state, and arguably encourages, rather than prohibits Jewish settlement in the area. Furthermore, according to the Israeli government, many of the settlements were established on the sites of former Jewish communities that had existed there prior to 1947 on land that was legitimately bought, and ethnically cleansed by Arab forces. Israel views the territory as being the subject of legitimate diplomatic dispute and negotiation under international law. East Jerusalem, captured in 1967, was unilaterally annexed by Israel. The UN Security Council Resolution 478 condemned the annexation as "a violation of international law". This annexation has not been recognized by other nations, although the United States Congress declared its intention to recognize the annexation (a proposal that has been condemned by other states and organizations). Because of the question of Jerusalem's status, most states base their diplomatic missions there and treat Tel Aviv as the capital, though the United States and Guatemala both have embassies in the Jerusalem. Israel asserts that these territories are not currently claimed by any other state and that Israel has the right to control them.

Israel's position has not been accepted by most countries and international bodies, and the West Bank (including East Jerusalem) and the Gaza Strip are referred to as occupied territories (with Israel as the occupying power) by most international legal and political bodies, the rest of the Arab bloc, the UK, including the EU, the United States (before President Trump), both the General Assembly and Security Council of the United Nations, the International Court of Justice, the Conference of High Contracting Parties to the Fourth Geneva Convention, and the Israeli Supreme Court (in a decision regarding the Israeli West Bank barrier).

Former U.S. President George W. Bush stated, during his presidency, that he did not expect Israel to return entirely to pre-1967 borders, due to "new realities on the ground."

Both US President Bill Clinton and UK Prime Minister Tony Blair, who played notable roles in attempts at mediation, noted the need for some territorial and diplomatic compromise on this issue, based on the validity of some of the claims of both sides. One compromise offered by Clinton would have allowed Israel to keep some settlements in the West Bank, especially those in large blocks near the pre-1967 borders of Israel. In return, Palestinians would have received concessions of land in other parts of the country. The United Nations did not declare any change in the status of the territories as of the creation of the Palestinian National Authority between 1993 and 2000, although a 1999 U.N. document implied that the chance for a change in that status was slim at that period.

During the period between the 1993 Oslo Accords and the Second Intifada beginning in 2000, Israeli officials asserted that the term "occupation" did not accurately reflect the state of affairs in the territories. During this time, the Palestinian population in large parts of the territories had a large degree of autonomy and only limited exposure to the IDF except when seeking to move between different areas. Following the events of the Second Intifada, and in particular, Operation Defensive Shield, most territories, including Palestinian cities (Area A), came back under effective Israeli military control, making the discussion along those lines largely moot.

In the summer of 2005, Israel implemented its unilateral disengagement plan; about 8,500 Israeli citizens living in the Gaza Strip were forcibly removed from the territory, along with citizens from 4 settlements in the northern West Bank; some were compensated with alternative homes and a sum of money. The Israel Defense Forces vacated Gaza in 2005, but invaded it again in 2006 in response to rocket attacks and the abduction of Israeli soldier Gilad Shalit by Hamas.

In January 2010, King Abdullah of Jordan, after a meeting with the Israeli president Shimon Peres at the World Economic Forum in Davos, declared that his country does not want to rule the West Bank and that "the two-state solution" to the Israeli–Palestinian conflict was the only viable option. If rule over the territory was to be transferred to the kingdom, it would only "replace Israeli military rule with Jordanian military rule... and the Palestinians want their own state."

In December 2010, Brazil recognized Palestine as a state with its 1967 borders. This move was later followed by Argentina, Peru, Uruguay, Bolivia and Ecuador. This action was later criticized by Israel and the United States, who labelled it "counterproductive".

Demographics

Palestinians

The Palestinian Central Bureau of Statistics (PCBS) estimated Palestinians at mid year 2009 as 10.7 million persons as follows: 3.9 million in the Palestinian Territory (36.6%), 1.2 million (11.5%) in Israel; 5.0 million in Arab countries (46.2%), 0.6 million in foreign countries (5.7%).

According to The Guardian (2008), the Palestinian territories have one of the fastest growing populations in the world, with numbers surging 30% in the past decade (2008). There were 3.76 million Palestinians in the West Bank and the Gaza Strip, up from 2.89 million ten years earlier.

According to the U.S. Census, population growth from 1990 to 2008 in Gaza and the West Bank was 106%, from 1.9 million (1990) to 3.9 million persons.

According to the UN (2010), the Palestinian population was 4.4 million. According to the Palestinian Central Bureau of Statistics (PCBS) population density in 2009 was 654 capita/km2, of which 433 capita/km2 in the West Bank including Jerusalem and 4,073 capita/km2 in Gaza Strip. In mid-2009, the share of population less than 15 years was 41.9% and above 65 years 3%.

Religion
The overwhelming majority of Palestinians are Muslims. Almost the entire Palestinian Muslim population is Sunni, although few dozen converts to Ahmadiyya Islam resides in West Bank. According to Palestinian constitution, article 4: "Islam is the official religion of Palestine. Respect for the sanctity of all other divine religions shall be maintained". Christians constitute about 1–2% of population of Palestinian territories. The Christian population of Gaza is estimated at about 3,000 There are also about 370 Samaritans in West Bank village of Kiryat Luza on Mount Gerizim who hold both Palestinian and Israeli citizenship. The number of Jewish settlers in West Bank is estimated at 341 000 as of the end of 2012 and over 200 000 in East Jerusalem.

Language
Arabic is the official language in the State of Palestine. Palestinian Arabic is the vernacular. Hebrew and English are widely spoken. 16.1% of the population are Israeli settlers who mostly speak Hebrew as their native language, and Hebrew is also a second or third language to many Palestinians.

Israeli settlers

The PCBS estimated that about 564,000 Israeli settlers lived in the West Bank in 2012. Some 203,000 of them were settled in East Jerusalem (Area J1 of the Jerusalem Governorate) and 346,000 in the remaining West Bank.

Consistent with its policy of Jerusalem as a united and indivisible capital of Israel, Israel does not publish exact figures of the number of settlers in East Jerusalem. Rather the figures of Israelis in Judea and Samaria District are given. Independently from the political composition of its subsequent governments, the number of settlers in the West Bank has grown rapidly and in a relatively straight line since 1967 (see graphics). The Israeli Central Bureau of Statistics counted about 341,000 settlers end 2012 in the Judea and Samaria District, which does not include Jerusalem.

Administrative divisions
The Constitution of the League of Arab States says the existence and independence of Palestine cannot be questioned de jure even though the outward signs of this independence have remained veiled as a result of force majeure. The League supervised the Egyptian trusteeship of the Palestinian government in Gaza after the termination of the British Mandate and secured assurances from Jordan that the 1950 Act of Union was "without prejudice to the final settlement".

By the 1988 declaration, the PNC empowered its central council to form a government-in-exile when appropriate, and called upon its executive committee to perform the duties of the government-in-exile until its establishment.

Under the terms of the Oslo Accords signed between Israel and the PLO, the latter assumed control over the Jericho area of the West Bank and the Gaza Strip on 17 May 1994. On 28 September 1995, following the signing of the Israeli–Palestinian Interim Agreement on the West Bank and Gaza Strip, Israeli military forces withdrew from the West Bank towns of Nablus, Ramallah, Jericho, Jenin, Tulkarem, Qalqilya and Bethlehem. In December 1995, the PLO also assumed responsibility for civil administration in 17 areas in Hebron. While the PLO assumed these responsibilities as a result of Oslo, a new temporary interim administrative body was set up as a result of the Accords to carry out these functions on the ground: the Palestinian National Authority (PNA).

An analysis outlining the relationship between the PLO, the PNA (PA), Palestine and Israel in light of the interim arrangements set out in the Oslo Accords begins by stating that, "Palestine may best be described as a transitional association between the PA and the PLO." It goes on to explain that this transitional association accords the PA responsibility for local government and the PLO responsibility for representation of the Palestinian people in the international arena, while prohibiting it from concluding international agreements that affect the status of the occupied territories. This situation is said to be accepted by the Palestinian population insofar as it is viewed as a temporary arrangement.

Since the Battle of Gaza (2007), the two separate territories, the Gaza Strip and the West Bank, are divided into a Hamas leadership in the Gaza Strip and a Fatah civil leadership in the autonomous areas of the West Bank. Each sees itself as the administrator of all Palestinian Territories and does not acknowledge the other one as the official government of the territories. The Palestinian Territories have therefore de facto split into two entities.

Governorates

After the signing of the Oslo Accords, the Palestinian territories were divided 16 governorates under the jurisdiction of the Palestinian National Authority. Since 2007 there are two governments claiming to be the legitimate government of the Palestinian National Authority, one based in the West Bank and one based in the Gaza Strip.

West Bank Areas

The Oslo II Accord created three temporary distinct administrative divisions in the Palestinian territories, the Areas A, B and C, until a final status accord would be established. The areas are not contiguous, but rather fragmented depending on the different population areas as well as Israeli military requirements.
 Area A (full civil and security control by the Palestinian Authority): circa 3% of the West Bank, exclusive East-Jerusalem (first phase, 1995). In 2011: 18%. This area includes all Palestinian cities and their surrounding areas, with no Israeli settlements. Entry into this area is forbidden to all Israeli citizens. The Israel Defense Forces occasionally enters the area to conduct raids to arrest suspected militants.
 Area B (Palestinian civil control and joint Israeli–Palestinian security control): circa 25% (first phase, 1995). In 2011: 21%. Includes areas of many Palestinian towns and villages and areas, with no Israeli settlements.
 Area C (full Israeli civil and security control, except over Palestinian civilians): circa 72% (first phase, 1995). In 2011: 61%. These areas include all Israeli settlements (cities, towns, and villages), nearby land, most roadways that connected the settlements (and which Israelis are now restricted to) as well as strategic areas described as "security zones." There were 1,000 Israeli settlers living in Area C in 1972. By 1993, their population had increased to 110,000.  they number more than 300,000 – as against 150,000 Palestinians, the majority of whom are Bedouin and fellahin.

History 

In 1922, after the collapse of the Ottoman Empire that ruled Greater Syria for four centuries (1517–1917), the British Mandate for Palestine was established. Large-scale Jewish immigration from abroad, mainly from Eastern Europe took place during the British Mandate, though Jewish immigration started during the Ottoman period. The future of Palestine was hotly disputed between Arabs and Jews. Public property or "crown lands", the bulk of which was in the Negev, belonging to the government of Palestine may have made up as much as 70% of the total land; with the Arabs, Christians and others owning the rest.

The 1947 United Nations Partition Plan proposed a division of Mandate Palestine between an Arab and a Jewish state, with Jerusalem and the surrounding area to be a corpus separatum under a special international regime. The regions allotted to the proposed Arab state included what became the Gaza Strip, and almost all of what became the West Bank, as well as other areas.

The Partition Plan was passed by the UN General Assembly in November 1947. The Partition Plan was accepted by the Jewish leadership, but rejected by the Arab leaders. The Arab League threatened to take military measures to prevent the partition of Palestine and to ensure the national rights of the Palestinian Arab population. One day before the expiration of the British Mandate for Palestine, on 14 May 1948, Israel declared its independence within the borders of the Jewish State set out in the Partition Plan. US President Harry Truman recognized the State of Israel de facto the following day. The Arab countries declared war on the newly formed State of Israel heralding the start of the 1948 Arab–Israeli War. Arab countries announced "an intervention in Palestine to restore law and order", heralding the start of the 1948 Palestine War.

After the 1947–1949 Palestine war, the 1949 Armistice Agreements established the separation lines between the combatants, leaving Israel in control of some of the areas designated for the Arab state under the Partition Plan, Transjordan in control of the West Bank, including East Jerusalem, Egypt in control of the Gaza Strip and Syria in control of the Himmah Area.

In 1950, Jordan annexed the West Bank. Only the United Kingdom formally recognized the annexation of the West Bank, excluding the case of East Jerusalem which was de facto recognized. In the Gaza Strip the Arab League formed the All-Palestine Government, which operated under Egypt occupation.

Article 24 of the Palestinian National Covenant of 1964, which established the Palestine Liberation Organization, stated: "This Organization does not exercise any territorial sovereignty over the West Bank in the Hashemite Kingdom of Jordan, on the Gaza Strip or in the Himmah Area" (i.e. the areas of the former Mandate Palestine controlled by Jordan, Egypt and Syria, respectively).

Israel captured both territories in the 1967 Six-Day War, as well as other territory belonging to Egypt and Syria. Since then, these territories have been designated Israeli-occupied territories. Immediately after the war, on 19 June 1967, the Israeli government offered to return the Golan Heights to Syria, the Sinai to Egypt and most of the West Bank to Jordan in exchange for peace. At the Khartoum Summit in September, the Arab parties responded to this overture by declaring "no peace with Israel, no recognition of Israel and no negotiations with Israel."

UN Security Council Resolution 242 introduced the "Land for Peace" formula for normalizing relations between Israel and its neighbors. This formula was used when Israel returned the Sinai Peninsula to Egypt in 1979 in exchange for a peace treaty. While that treaty mentioned a "linkage" between Israeli–Egyptian peace and Palestinian autonomy, the formerly Egyptian-occupied territory in Gaza was excluded from the agreement, and remained under Israeli control.

The Oslo Accords of the early 1990s between the Palestine Liberation Organization and Israel led to the creation of the Palestinian Authority. This was an interim organization created to administer a limited form of Palestinian self-governance in the territories for a period of five years during which final-status negotiations would take place. The Palestinian Authority carried civil responsibility in some rural areas, as well as security responsibility in the major cities of the West Bank and the Gaza Strip. Although the five-year interim period expired in 1999, the final status agreement has yet to be concluded despite attempts such as the 2000 Camp David Summit, the Taba summit, and the unofficial Geneva Accords.

See also

 Outline of the State of Palestine
 Coordinator of Government Activities in the Territories
 Economy of the State of Palestine
 Healthcare in the State of Palestine
 Judea and Samaria Area
 Legality of the Israeli occupation of Palestine
 Palestinian Environmental NGOs Network
 Racism in the State of Palestine
 Tourism in the State of Palestine
 Water, Sanitation and Hygiene Monitoring Program
 Water supply and sanitation in the State of Palestine

Notes

References

External links

 Statistical Atlas of Palestine at the Palestinian Central Bureau of Statistics.
 Global Integrity Report: West Bank has a governance and anti-corruption profile.
 Gaza Strip. The World Factbook. Central Intelligence Agency.
 West Bank. The World Factbook. Central Intelligence Agency.
 Palestinian Territories at the United States Department of State.
 Palestine from UCB Libraries GovPubs.
 
 Palestine under the Ottoman Rule
 Palestinian territories street-art
 , published by the United Nations Department of Public Information, March 2003. UN Brochure DPI/2276. Online, chapters are in PDF format.

 
Disputed territories in Asia

Middle East
Territories
Western Asia
Territories